Tonson or Tõnson is a surname. Notable people with this surname include the following.

Jacob Tonson, (1655 – 1736), English bookseller and publisher
Leopold Tõnson,  (1878 – 1935), Estonian military
Ludlow Tonson, 3rd Baron Riversdale (1784 – 1861), Irish bishop
William Tonson, 1st Baron Riversdale (1724 – 1787), Irish politician

See also

Tenson (disambiguation)
Tondon (disambiguation)
Tonson Group
Tonton (disambiguation)
Towson (disambiguation)
Tân Sơn (disambiguation)